A bastide is a fortified new town built in medieval Languedoc, Gascony and Aquitaine in Southwest France during the Middle Ages.

Bastide may also refer to:

Bastide (Provençal manor), a large farmhouse or manor in Provence, France
Bastide (surname), a surname

See also
La Bastide (disambiguation), many places in France